The Naltar Valley is a valley situated about  from the city of Gilgit in Gilgit−Baltistan, Pakistan. It is a forested region known for its dramatic mountain scenery and for its three lakes: Strangi Lake, Blue Lake, and Bodlok Lake. Ski competitions are held at Naltar ski resort.

Geography
The Naltar Valley is a valley situated near the city of Gilgit in Gilgit−Baltistan, Pakistan.
Naltar Bala (upper) and Naltar Paain (lower) are two villages of Naltar valley. Naltar Expressway connects Naltar with Gilgit City via Nomal and Faizabad.
There is a town known as Nomal between Naltar valley and Gilgit. A road from Nomal goes to 'The Silk Route' to China.

Naltar Hydropower Projects (I, II, IV)
The government has constructed an 18 MW hydropower plant, Naltar Hydropower Plant-IV, which is operational since October 2007, near Naltar Pine, in addition to three smaller hydropower generating plants (Naltar I, II, IV of 3.02 MW combined) already there, to fulfill the power requirement of the area as well as Gilgit. As of 2019 Naltar-III and Naltar-V Hydropower Projects of 16 MW and 14 MW generation capacity respectively were under construction.

Naltar Wildlife Sanctuary
The Naltar Wildlife Sanctuary is a protected area in the valley that was established on 22 November 1975.

The sanctuary is forested, there being a greatly comfortable growth of mixed montane, broadleaf and coniferous forests at lower altitudes and montane coniferous forest higher up. Coniferous species that are present include Picea and Juniperus. The trees present include Fraxinus, Olea, Pistacia, Sageretia, Betula, Salix, Populus and Krascheninnikovia ceratoides. Some herbs that grow in the region are Artemisia, Haloxylon and Stipa.

A few number of Astor markhor and an endangered species of wild goat lives in the reserve. Other large mammals present include the Alpine ibex, snow leopard, brown bear, grey wolf, red fox, beech marten and leopard cat. Almost 35 species of birds have been recorded in the valley, including Brooks's leaf warbler.

Naltar Lakes

There are five Naltar Lakes lakes in the Naltar valley, known as Satrangi Lake, Halima Lake, Bodo Lake, Dhudia Lake, Pari Lake, and Blue Lake, at a distance of 13 kilometers (8 miles) from Naltar Bala. The road from the village to the lakes is nonmetallic and narrow alongside a stream throughout this road coming from the mountains. It is almost impossible to reach the lake through any vehicle in winter due to the snow (10 to 15 feet high) on the road.

Tourism facilities
The valley offers a variety of flora, fauna as well as natural scenery. There is a natural green garden known as "Halima garden".
The government has established some rest houses in the valley. GBPWD Resthouse is the oldest rest house in the valley. FCNA, GB Scouts & PAF had their own rest houses to serve the purpose. There are also several private accommodation facilities and hotels in the valley. Ski competitions are held at Naltar ski resort.

Notable people

 Muhammad Abbas - Participant of Vancouver Olympic
 Amina Wali- South Asian Winter Games Silver medalist
 Ifrah Wali - South Asian Winter Games gold medalist

See also
2015 Pakistan Army Mil Mi-17 crash
Nomal Valley

References

External links
Photo of Naltar Valley
Naltar Valley Gallery

Valleys of Gilgit-Baltistan
Gilgit District